St John's Church, Old Colwyn, is on Station Road, Old Colwyn, in Conwy County Borough, Wales.  It is a member church of the Aled Mission Area, in the archdeaconry of St Asaph and the diocese of St Asaph.  St John's was built as the daughter church of St Catherine's Church, Abergele Road, Colwyn.  It is designated by Cadw as a Grade II* listed building.

History
The church was built for the English-speaking community when the services at St Catherine's were conducted in Welsh.  It was designed by the Chester firm of Douglas and Minshull.  The foundation stone was laid in 1899 by Mrs Eleanor Frost who also paid for many of the church furnishings, including the reredos, altar, rails, screen and the pulpit.  The tower was added in 1912 after the death of John Douglas, when the firm was known as Douglas, Minshull and Muspratt.

Architecture

The external walls are built in local Penmaen limestone with Hollington sandstone dressings.  The internal walls are in ashlar Hollington sandstone.  The tower is at the west end and the roof has the style of a double hammerbeam.  The stained glass in one of the windows in the south aisle is by Charles Kempe.

External features
The entrance gate to the churchyard is a Grade II listed building.

See also
List of new churches by John Douglas

References

External links
St John's Church, Old Colwyn
St John's, Old Colwyn Find us on Facebook

The Church of St John the Baptist
Grade II* listed churches in Conwy County Borough
Gothic Revival church buildings in Wales
19th-century Church in Wales church buildings
Old Colwyn
John Douglas buildings
Churches completed in 1903
Churches completed in 1912
1912 establishments in Wales